Klæmint Andrasson Olsen (born 17 July 1990) is a Faroese footballer who plays as a striker for Besta deild karla club Breiðablik and the Faroe Islands national team. Olsen spent his entire football career with his hometown club NSÍ Runavík before joining Breiðablik on loan in 2022. As of 2022, he is the all-time top scorer in the Faroe Islands Premier League with 230 goals. He has been the topscorer of the Faroe Islands Premier League six times as of November 2020.

Club career
In the 2011 season, Olsen was the Faroese league's second highest scorer, scoring 17 goals in the league for NSÍ Runavík.

On 15 September 2013, he scored all four goals in a 4–3 win against KÍ.

Beginning in 2013, Olsen won the Golden Boot in four consecutive seasons. In the 2013 season, Olsen was the highest goal-scorer in the division with 21 goals, winning the Golden Boot. In the following three seasons, he was once again the highest scorer: in 2014, with 22 goals; in 2015, with 21 goals; and in 2016, with 23 goals. He won the Golden Boot again in 2019 with 26 goals and in 2020 together with Uroš Stojanov they scored 17 goals each.

Olsen scored a hat-trick for NSÍ in a 2018–19 UEFA Europa League qualifier against Hibernian. In the 2020–21 season, he scored a hat-trick against Barry Town United in a Europa League qualifier, becoming the first Faroese to score two hat-tricks in European football.

On 27 September 2020, he scored his 200th goal number in the Faroe Islands Premier League, becoming the first male player to score 200 goals in the Faroese top tier. All 200 goals were scored for the same club, NSÍ Runavík. He scored in a 4–1 victory against Skála ÍF.

On 13 December 2022, Olsen agreed to join Besta deild karla club Breiðablik on an one-year loan deal. At the same time he has renewed his contract with Runavík till the end of 2024.

International career
Olsen was first called up to the Faroe Islands squad in February 2012 for a training camp held in Spain and scored the winning goal in a friendly match against Spanish team La Union. He made his official debut in a World Cup qualifying match versus Germany on 7 September 2012, coming on as a late substitute.

Olsen scored his first international goal against Spain in a UEFA Euro 2020 qualifying match.

International goals
Scores and results list Faroe Islands' goal tally first, score column indicates score after each Olsen goal.

References

External links
 

1990 births
Living people
People from Runavík
Faroese footballers
Association football forwards
Faroe Islands international footballers
Faroe Islands youth international footballers
NSÍ Runavík players